Issa Laura López Lozano is a Mexican producer, writer and film director. Eleven Spanish language features have been produced from her scripts, four of them directed by herself. She has won several literary awards, including the National Novel Award granted by Mexico's Institute of Fine Arts and Literature in 2007.

In 2017, Tigers Are Not Afraid (Vuelven in Spanish) premiered at Fantastic Fest, in Austin, Texas. Written and directed by López, the film received the Best Horror Director Award, and went on to collect fifty-one awards in film festivals around the world, three Diosas de Plata, including Best Picture and Best Director, and received ten Ariel Awards nominations, of which it won two. The film earned multiple positive reviews by major trades and critics, and a "Certified Fresh" rating of 97% on Rotten Tomatoes.

Currently, López is developing projects with Guillermo del Toro, Noah Hawley and Jason Blum.

Early life 
Issa Laura López Lozano was born in Mexico City, where she was raised by her father after her mother died when she was eight years old. Her father was a semiotics academic and a college professor. During her childhood her family faced economic hardships, since academia is not a high-paying job in Latin America. This was a defining aspect of her life, inspiring much of her later work, since her dad would try to keep her and her sister entertained in spite of their economic situation. Lopez explained in one of her interviews that she, her sister and her dad would “go every weekend on some road trip through Mexico, from small town to small town, sitting to watch kung fu and horror movies in traveling cinemas, eating street food, visiting archeological sites, jungles, deserts and the most haunted little towns in the country". Those memories were the inspiration for many of her stories.

Life and career 

Issa López studied Archeology for about two years, until "the pull of cinema was too strong to resist". She abandoned Archeology and enrolled in Mexico's National University Filmschool, where she obtained a BA in Film Directing and Screenwriting. After her BA, she completed a two-year graduate program for dramatic writing. López began co-writing telenovelas and TV shows at Televisa. In 2003, she wrote the film Ladies’ Night which was a box-office success, becoming the 5th biggest grossing Mexican film of 2003 and 2004.

López has won several literary awards, including the National Novel Award granted by Mexico's Institute of Fine Arts and Literature. In addition to her literary work, she penned multiple TV shows, some of them reaching the highest audience ratings in Mexican prime-time TV, and wrote the scripts for several film features, three of them produced in Mexico by the Major Hollywood Studios, and two of those directed by herself; Efectos Secundarios (Warner Bros., 2006) and Casi Divas (Sony Pictures, 2008). In 2015, López shot her third feature as a director, and tenth as a writer, Tigers Are Not Afraid. In March 2018, Todo Mal, her fourth feature film as a director, 11th as a writer, opened in Mexico.

In 2005, López was selected as one of the 50 Latino Impact Players in Entertainment, by Variety.

In Mexico, López’ movies have ranked among the highest grossing local productions: Ladies' Night (Disney, 2003) ranked fifth, Niñas Mal (Sony Pictures, 2007) seventh, and Efectos Secundarios fifteenth. Casi Divas opened in first place in the box office and went on to a limited theatrical run in the U.S.

Casi Divas received enthusiastic reviews from Variety, The Hollywood Reporter, and the L.A. Times, among others. The film is the only Mexican movie to be scored by acclaimed Hollywood composer Hans Zimmer, who only charged $1 for his extensive work on the film.

In 2015, 600 Millas, a film with a script co-written by López, was nominated for the Mexican Film Academy Ariel Award for Best Script.

In September 2017, Tigers Are Not Afraid (Vuelven in Spanish) Premiered at Fantastic Fest, in Austin Texas, and received the Best Horror Director Award. Issa López directed, wrote, and was Executive Producer of the film, a dark fable about the children surviving the Mexican drug war, and the ghosts that haunt them.

Tigers Are Not Afraid collected a total of fifty-one awards in Film Festivals around the world, three Diosas de Plata (the Mexican equivalent of the Golden Globes), including Best Picture and Best Director, and has received 10 nominations for the Ariel, (the Mexican Film Academy Award), of which it won two, has earned a large amount of positive reviews by major trades and critics, and a "Certified Fresh" rating of 97% in Rotten Tomatoes. It also got a Best Latin American Director Award in 2019 from NALIP (National Association of Latino Producers) and Fangoria Magazine, specialized in Horror Cinema, awarded it Best Foreign Language Movie in 2020. Stephen King, Neil Gaiman and Guillermo Del Toro manifested their enthusiasm for the movie via social media and interviews.

Currently, López is working with Guillermo del Toro, who announced that he'd produce Lopez' next film, a haunted western about the werewolf mythology, Searchlight Pictures signed her to write and direct The Book of Souls, to be produced by Noah Hawley, and Blumhouse is developing Our Lady of Tears, written and directed by López. She will also write, produce and direct the fourth season of cult HBO series True Detective.

Selected filmography

Awards 
Fiction Writer awards

	Mexico's National Institute of Fine Arts Novel Award, 2007.
	Efraín Huerta Short Story Award, 1995.
	Punto de Partida Short Story Award, 1995
	Alica Short Story Award, 1994.
	Finalist, Ricardo Pozas Short Story Award, 1996.
	Finalist, Efren Hernández Short Story Award, 1994.
	Finalist, New Writers Plaza y Valdes Award, 1992.

	Movie awards
       Winner: Cyprus International Film Festival Best screenplay Award, Ladie's night, 2003
	Winner: Diosa de Plata award for Best Screenplay Award, Efectos Secundarios. 2007.
	Winner: Best Screenplay at the Los Angeles Latino International Film Festival, Casi Divas, 2009.
       Nominated: Mexican Film Academy Ariel Award, Best Screenplay 600 Millas 2016
       Winner: Fantastic Fest Best Horror Director Award: Issa López, Tigers Are Not Afraid 2017
       Winner: Screamfest, Los Angeles, CA: Best Actress: Paola Lara, Tigers Are Not Afraid. 2017
       Winner: Screamfest, Best Actor: José Ramón López, Tigers Are Not Afraid 2017
       Winner: Screamfest, Best Editing: Joaquim Martí, Tigers Are Not Afraid 2017
       Winner: Screamfest, Best Director: Issa López, Tigers Are Not Afraid 2017
       Winner: Screamfest, Best Picture: Tigers Are Not Afraid. 2017
 Winner: Dedfest, Alberta, Canada: Audience Award for Best Picture: Tigers Are Not Afraid. 2017
       Winner: Mórbido Fest, Mexico City, Mexico: Press Award: Tigers Are Not Afraid. 2017
       Winner: Mórbido Fest, Best Latin-American Picture: Tigers Are Not Afraid. 2017
       Winner: Ithaca Fantastik, NY: Audience Award, Best Pur Film: Tigers Are Not Afraid. 2017
       Winner: Paris International Fantastic Film Festival: L'Oeil D'Or, Audience Best Picture Award: Tigers Are Not Afraid. 2017 
       Winner: Paris International Fantastic Film Festival: Cinema+ Frisson Best Picture Award: Tigers Are Not Afraid. 2017
       Winner: NOXFILMEST, El Salto, Uruguay: Best Feature, Jury Award: Tigers Are Not Afraid. 2018
       Winner: Panic Fest, Kansas City, Best Feature, Jury Award: Tigers Are Not Afraid. 2018
       Winner: Lost Weekend, Austin, TX: Best Script: Tigers Are Not Afraid. 2018.
       Winner: Lost Weekend, Austin, TX: Best Director: Tigers Are Not Afraid 2018
       Winner: Boston Underground Film Fest: Best Feature, Audience Award: Tigers Are Not Afraid. 2018
       Winner: Chattanooga Film Festival: Best Feature Award: Tigers Are Not Afraid. 2018
       Winner: Chicago Latino Film Festival: Best Feature, Audience Award:Tigers Are Not Afraid. 2018
       Winner: Brussels International Fantastic Film Festival, Silver Raven Award (Jury Award, 2nd Place). Tigers Are Not Afraid. 2018
       Winner: Brussels International Fantastic Film Festival, Best Feature, Audience Award: Tigers Are Not Afraid. 2018
       Winner: Imagine International Fantastic Film Festival, Amsterdam: Black Tulip (Jury Award): Tigers Are Not Afraid. 2018
       Winner: Calgary Underground Film Festival: Best Feature, Audience Award:Tigers Are Not Afraid. 2018
 Winner: Diosa de Plata, Mexico Film Critics Association Award: Best Child Actor, Paola Lara, Tigers Are Not Afraid. 2018
       Winner: Diosa de Plata, Mexico Film Critics Association Award: Best Director, Issa López. Tigers Are Not Afraid. 2018
 Winner: Diosa de Plata, Mexico Film Critics Association Award: Best Picture, Tigers Are Not Afraid. 2018
       Nominated: Mexican Film Academy Ariel Award, Best Screen Play, Tigers Are Not Afraid. 2018
 Nominated: Mexican Film Academy Ariel Award, Best Director, Issa López, Tigers Are Not Afraid. 2018.
Winner: Calgary Underground Film Festival: Best Feature (Audience Award), Tigers Are Not Afraid. 2018.
Winner: Hola Mexico Film Festival, Los Angeles: Best Director, Issa López, Tigers Are Not Afraid. 2018.
Winner: Hola Mexico Film Festival, Los Angeles: Best Feature (Audience Award), Tigers Are Not Afraid. 2018.
Winner: Fant Bilbao, Spain: Best Script, Tigers Are Not Afraid. 2018.
Winner: [http://fantbilbao.eus/web/fant-2018/palmares Fant Bilbao, Spain: Best Feature (Audience Award) Tigers Are Not Afraid'''] 2018.
Winner: BIFAN, South Korea: Best Director, Issa López, Tigers Are Not Afraid. 2018.
Winner: Popcorn Frights, Florida: Best Feature (Jury Award), Tigers Are Not Afraid. 2018.
Winner: Grimmfest, Manchester: Best Feature (Jury Award), Tigers Are Not Afraid. 2018.
Winner: Grimmfest, Manchester: Best Feature (Audience Award), Tigers Are Not Afraid. 2018.
Winner: Grimmfest, Manchester: Best Script, Tigers Are Not Afraid. 2018.
Winner: Lund Fantastic Film Festival, Sweden: Best Feature (Audience Award) Tigers Are Not Afraid, 2018.
Winner: Celluloid Screams, Sheffield UK: Best Movie (Audience Award) Tigers Are Not Afraid. 2018.Winner: Nocturna Festival, Madrid: Dark Visions Best Feature (Jury Award) Tigers Are Not Afraid. 2018.
Winner: Toronto After Dark: Best Screenplay Tigers Are Not Afraid 2018.
Winner: Toronto After Dark: Best Director, Issa López, Tigers Are Not Afraid. 2018.
Winner: Toronto After Dark: Most Original Film,Tigers Are Not Afraid. 2018.
Winner: Toronto After Dark: Best Feature Silver Award, Tigers Are Not Afraid. 2018.
Winner: Cine Mexico Now, Detroit: Best Feature (Audience Award), Tigers Are Not Afraid. 2018.
Winner: Terror Molins, Catalonia: Best Director, Issa López, Tigers Are Not Afraid. 2018.
Winner: Terror Molins, Catalonia: Best Feature Critics Golden Award, Tigers Are Not Afraid. 2018.
Winner: Saskatoon Fantastic Film Festival, Canada: Best Horror Feature (Audience Award, Gold), Tigers Are Not Afraid. 2018.
Winner: Buenos Aires Rojo Sangre, Argentina: Best Feature, Tigers Are Not Afraid. 2018
Winner: Buenos Aires Rojo Sangre, Argentina: Best Script, Issa López, Tigers Are Not Afraid. 2018.
Nominated: Latino Entertainment Journalists Association, Best Original Screenplay, Issa López, Tigers Are Not Afraid'', 2020
Winner: NALIP (National Association of Latino Independent Producers) Best Latin American Director, Issa López, Tigers Are Not Afraid, 2019
Winner: Fangoria Chainsaw Award, Best Foreign Language Movie, Tigers Are Not Afraid. 2020.

References

External links 
 

Living people
Mexican women film directors
Film directors from Mexico City
1971 births